Diarsia taidactyla is a moth of the family Noctuidae. It is found in Taiwan.

References

Moths described in 2007
Diarsia